The Minister of War of Italy, was the minister responsible for the Ministry of War and the Royal Italian Army. The position was abolished with the creation of the position for Minister of Defence.

The first Minister of War was Manfredo Fanti, a General of the Royal Italian Army, while the last one was Cipriano Facchinetti, a member of the Italian Republican Party. The longest serving minister was the Italian dictator, Benito Mussolini, of the National Fascist Party.

List of Ministers

Kingdom of Italy
 Parties

Coalitions

Republic of Italy
Parties

Coalitions

See also
 Italian Minister of the Air Force 
 Italian Minister of the Navy

References

War